Marián Süttö (born ) is a retired Slovak professional footballer and currently a manager of Slovan Galanta in 3. Liga West. He previously coached Slovak Super Liga club FC Nitra.

References

External links
 Futbalnet profile
 

1965 births
Living people
Sportspeople from Nitra
Slovak footballers
Slovak football managers
Association football midfielders
FC Nitra players
FK Dukla Banská Bystrica players
TJ OFC Gabčíkovo players
FK Dubnica players
FC Senec players
FK ŠKP Inter Dúbravka Bratislava players
OFK 1948 Veľký Lapáš players
Czechoslovak First League players
Slovak National Football League players
Slovak Super Liga players
2. Liga (Slovakia) players
3. Liga (Slovakia) players
4. Liga (Slovakia) players
Slovak Super Liga managers
Expatriate footballers in Austria
Slovak expatriate sportspeople in Austria
FC Nitra managers
ŠKF iClinic Sereď managers
FC ViOn Zlaté Moravce - Vráble B managers
TJ OFC Gabčíkovo managers
FC Slovan Galanta managers
MFK Lokomotíva Zvolen managers
4. Liga (Slovakia) managers
3. Liga (Slovakia) managers
2. Liga (Slovakia) managers